José Antonio Murgas is a Colombian politician. Murgas was Minister of Work and Social Security under the presidency of Misael Pastrana by Decree 739 of April 17, 1973 replacing Crispin Villazon de Armas. Murgas was also appointed Governor of the Department of Cesar between August 22, 1970 and June 17, 1971. Murgas also served as Ambassador of Colombia to the United Nations.

Governor of Department of Cesar (1970–1971)

Cabinet

Secretary of Government: Jaime Calderon Bruges
Secretary of Development: Jose Maria Oñate Araujo
Secretary of Finances: Rafael Gonzalez Daza
Secretary of Education: Jose Diaz Cuadro
Chief of Planning: Luis Enrique Duran Arias
Chief of Judicial Bureau: Nestor Vizcaino

References

Colombian Ministers of Labour and Social Protection

Governors of Cesar Department
Colombian Liberal Party politicians
Free University of Colombia alumni
Living people
Year of birth missing (living people)